Þrídrangaviti Lighthouse (transliterated as Thridrangaviti) is a lighthouse  off the southwest coast of Iceland, in the archipelago of Vestmannaeyjar, often described as the most isolated lighthouse in the world. Þrídrangar means "three rock pillars", referring to the three named rocks at that location: Stóridrangur (on which the lighthouse stands), Þúfudrangur, and Klofadrangur. It was constructed in 1938 and 1939, with the lighthouse commissioned in 1942. Originally constructed and accessible only by scaling the rock on which it is situated, it is accessible by helicopter since the construction of a helipad. 

Technical characteristics:
 The light can be seen at nine nautical miles

The lighthouse was built under the direction of Árni G. Þórarinsson, who recruited experienced mountaineers to scale the rock on which it is located. Their climbing tools did not allow them to bite into the rock near the top, and there were no handholds near the top, so they made a human pyramid (one man on his knees, a second atop him, and a third one climbing on the second one) to reach it.

References 

Lighthouses in Iceland